Maurice Marie Jean Pon (26 October 1921 in Bordeaux – 3 April 2019) was a French lyricist who mainly worked with Henri Salvador.

In 1949, Pon wrote the lyrics of "Le Loup, la Biche et le Chevalier". With Salvador, Pon also wrote "" and other well-known French songs. He also wrote for Bourvil, Fernandel, Jean Sablon, André Claveau and Les Frères Jacques.

Pon died in Île-de-France, at the age of 97.

Bibliography 
 Maurice Pon, Ma Chanson douce avec Henri Salvador. Souvenirs d’un homme de paroles, Mustang éditions, 2011

References

External links 

 
 Maurice Pon on Encyclopédisque

1921 births
2019 deaths
French lyricists
Writers from Bordeaux